Wittelte is a village in the Dutch province of Drenthe. It is a part of the municipality of Westerveld, and lies about 15 km northwest of Hoogeveen.

Wittelte is first mentioned as Withelte in 1040 when Emperor Henry III donates estates from a certain Uffo and his brothers, located in Uffelte, Wittelte and Peelo, to Bishop Bernold of Utrecht.

References

Populated places in Drenthe
Westerveld